Current railway stations in Ethiopia are served by standard gauge railways of the National Railway Network of Ethiopia which is mostly under construction, except the Addis Ababa–Djibouti Railway. Other stations were built for the in 2018 still operating metre gauge Ethio-Djibouti Railways, although this railway has officially been superseded by the new Addis Ababa-Djibouti Railway.

The following list contains dedicated railway stations with at least a single platform for passengers to enter or to leave trains. Train stops on open stretches without platform can outnumber train stops in railway stations by a 2:1 margin, but the former are not included in the lists. The railways usually also have a number of freight yards and dry ports for freight handling, but these are not counted as well.

Standard gauge railways

Description of railway stations 

Railway stations mostly have a single platform for passengers to enter or to leave trains. These platforms allow access without having the need to use stairs. Some have two platforms connected through a footbridge above the overhead catenary system. The platforms are roofed to protect passengers against sun, wind and rain. Railway stations for passenger trains always have a station building directly attached to the back of the principal platform. Consequently, all railway stations with a single platform have space for only one platform line and do not allow the presence of more than one train at the platform at the same time. In contrast, railway stations with two platforms have the space for two or three platform lines. All platforms are around 330 meters long.

The station buildings are used for ticketing and for refreshments and contain waiting rooms and even rooms for prayers. They have media available (at least electricity, water). The outer appearance of station buildings of the Addis Ababa–Djibouti Railway shows some sort of architectural eclecticism including Ethiopian elements with some Chinese interpretation and rounded elements. The railway station buildings on the Awash–Hara Gebeya Railway are rather functional and rectangular.

The stations on the Addis Ababa–Djibouti Railway were built in 2015 and 2016, the stations on the Awash–Hara Gebeya Railway were built in 2017 and 2018 for the section between Awash and Kombolcha. For the sections between Kombolcha and Hara Gebeya and between Hara Gebeya and Mek'ele, all stations are planned. No clear date for building them is known.

In the following, most stations are coined closed, these do exist but there is no use by passengers yet (train stations would be operational but there are no scheduled passenger services yet). Some stations are called U/C, meaning under construction, others are planned and do not exist up to now. In total, there are 36 railway stations (existing, under construction and planned).

List of railway stations

Passenger railway stations 
The stations below are passenger railway stations on operational railways and on railways currently under construction. Some of them are "open" (means, they see passengers), some of them are "closed" (means they are ready for service but not in use for the moment.

Other railway stations are under construction ("U/C") or are "planned" (while the railway is under construction already).

Railways in planning stage 
The railway stations provided below are for planned railways. As these railways are in planning stage, the stations and station names are very preliminary and subject to change.

Metre gauge railway 
The metre gauge Ethio-Djibouti Railway was built between 1898-1917. Railway station buildings were built in part later, in part never. Only the two main cities along the line (Addis Ababa, Dire Dawa) saw bigger and dedicated station buildings with platforms. Most railway stations were composed of very simple single-room buildings, sometimes open without walls, sometimes closed, sometimes like goats sheds. No platforms.

Three types of railway stations exist: open, abandoned and defunct. The latter still exist while the status of abandoned railway stations is uncertain. Maybe they were totally demolished, maybe not. There are also some open railway stations, as the metre gauge railway still operates in 2018 with passenger services.

Main stations

Other stations

See also 
 Transport in Ethiopia
 Rail transport in Ethiopia
 Railway stations in Djibouti
 Railway stations in Sudan
 Railway stations in Eritrea
 Lamu Port and Lamu-Southern Sudan-Ethiopia Transport Corridor
 List of cities and towns in Ethiopia

References

External links 
 UN Horn of Africa Map
 ET Map
 The Franco-Ethiopian and Djibouto-Ethiopian Railway
 Gradient profile
 NatGeo Map
 NationsOnline Map

 
Railway stations
Railways stations